Sir Thomas Glover was English ambassador to the Sublime Porte of the Ottoman Empire in Constantinople from 1606 to 1611.

Glover was born to a Protestant family, his great uncle had been burnt at the stake for his beliefs during the reign of Queen Mary, while during the reign of Elizabeth I his father rose to become Sheriff of London. According to Scottish author and traveller William Lithgow, Glover was born to an English father and a Polish mother and was born and raised in Constantinople, where Glover served as secretary to the English ambassadors Edward Barton and Sir Henry Lello before succeeding Lello as ambassador on December 23, 1606.  Fluent in Turkish, Greek, Italian and Polish, he was a competent diplomat and respected in the court. He is known to have imprisoned the Catholic traveler and scholar Hugh Holland for speaking out against Elizabeth.

The English writer William Strachey served as his secretary for a period and he also gave lodging to other travellers and writers including the aforementioned Lithgow and George Sandys.  Glover was recalled to London in a company letter dated September 17, 1611.

Glover's wife Anne Lambe, an English woman he had met and married in England and brought her to Constantinople, died of the Plague 1608 but was not buried until 1612 in the city.

References

Ambassadors of England to the Ottoman Empire
17th-century English diplomats
Year of death missing
Year of birth missing